Mayfield is an suburban community in New Castle County, Delaware, United States. It was the teenage home of President Joe Biden.

Geography

History
Mayfield was developed in the 1950s and is described as being at the time a "rapidly growing middle-class community", where "many fathers were accountants, lawyers, and chemists..."

Mayfield is the site of the teenage home of U.S. politician Joe Biden, who moved to Mayfield in 1955 with his family when he was 13 and lived in a typical split-level house on Wilson Road. In his book Promises to Keep he says of Mayfield:
"The houses in my neighborhood, Mayfield, had sprouted just a few years earlier from what had been a flat and treeless farm field. There wasn't a spot of shade in the neighborhood. The streets were smooth, fast, and narrow—built for speed. They were great for bike races and whiffle ball. But everything there felt squared off, as if in perfect obeisance to the suburban God of Right Angles. Uniformity ruled. Every roof had the same pitch."

References 

Unincorporated communities in New Castle County, Delaware
Unincorporated communities in Delaware
1955 establishments in Delaware